"In the Heat of the Night" is a 1985 song by German singer Sandra, written by Michael Cretu, Hubert Kemmler, Markus Löhr and Klaus Hirschburger, and produced by Cretu. Kemmler also provided backing vocals on this recording as well as numerous Sandra's songs in the 80s.

"In the Heat of the Night" was released in November 1985 as the second single from Sandra's debut album The Long Play, as a follow-up to her no. 1 European hit "(I'll Never Be) Maria Magdalena". The single was a major commercial success, reaching the top 5 in numerous countries, including Germany, Switzerland and Sweden, where it peaked at no. 2. It was a top 20 hit in the pan-European sales and airplay charts at the turn of 1985 and 1986. In Germany and Austria, it was a top 5 and a top 10 airplay hit, respectively. It remains one of Sandra's biggest hits.

In 1999, the song was remixed for the compilation My Favourites and released as a promotional vinyl single in France. It was remixed again for the 2006 compilation Reflections, and subsequently in 2007 for the special edition of Reflections released in France. The 2007 remixes were released as a digital single. In 2016, "In the Heat of the Night" (Tropical Future Remix) was released as a digital single to promote the new greatest hits collection The Very Best of Sandra.

Music video
The music video was directed by Michael Bentele and pictures Sandra performing the song in a steamy sauna, surrounded by bare-chested men. The clip was released on Sandra's VHS video compilations Ten on One (The Singles) and 18 Greatest Hits, released in 1987 and 1992, respectively, as well as the 2003 DVD The Complete History.

Formats and track listings
7" single (1985)
A. "In the Heat of the Night"
B. "Heatwave" (Instrumental)

12" single (1985)
A. "In the Heat of the Night" (Extended Version) – 7:32
B. "Heatwave" (Instrumental) – 3:48

12" promo single (1999)
A. "In the Heat of the Night" (Original Version) – 5:07
B. "In the Heat of the Night" (99 Remix) – 4:28

Digital download (2007)
"In the Heat of the Night" (Future Vision Remix - Radio Edit) – 3:17
"In the Heat of the Night" (Superfunk Remix - Radio Edit) – 3:46
"In the Heat of the Night" (Future Vision Remix - Extended) – 7:13
"In the Heat of the Night" (Superfunk Remix - Extended) – 6:00

Digital download (2016)
"In the Heat of the Night" (Tropical Future Remix by masQraider) – 4:04

Charts

Weekly charts

Year-end charts

Certifications

Cover versions
 Finnish gothic metal band To/Die/For covered the song on their 1999 album All Eternity. When released as a single in 2000, their version reached no. 17 in Finland.

References

External links
 "In the Heat of the Night" at Discogs

1985 singles
1985 songs
2007 singles
2016 singles
Sandra (singer) songs
Song recordings produced by Michael Cretu
Songs written by Hubert Kemmler
Songs written by Klaus Hirschburger
Songs written by Markus Löhr
Songs written by Michael Cretu
Virgin Records singles